Teed Michael "Buzz" Moseley (born September 3, 1949) is a retired United States Air Force general who served as the 18th Chief of Staff of the United States Air Force. He is a fighter pilot with more than 3,000 flight hours in fighters and trainers, most in the F-15 Eagle.

On 2 September 2005, Moseley assumed his final Air Force assignment as Chief of Staff of the Air Force—the senior uniformed Air Force officer responsible for the organization, training and equipage of more than 700,000 active-duty, Guard, Reserve and civilian forces serving in the United States and overseas. As a member of the Joint Chiefs of Staff, the general and other service chiefs function as military advisers to the Secretary of Defense, National Security Council, and the President.
 	
Moseley resigned from the Air Force at the request of U.S. Secretary of Defense Robert Gates in June 2008 in the wake of a number of Air Force scandals, including a 2007 scandal related to the Air Force's handling of the security of nuclear weapons at Minot Air Force Base, despite having directed over 120 actions to focus directly on the service's adherence to policy guidance and operational processes relative to nuclear assurance. At the time there were multiple media reports suggesting the rationale for the forced retirements of both the Secretary of the Air Force and the Chief of Staff was actually disagreements between the Air Force and the Secretary of Defense on the path of Air Force budgets, modernization and recapitalization. Specifically, that General Moseley continued to aggressively support the full procurement of the F-22, larger numbers of the F-35, Next-Generation Bomber, enhanced unmanned aerial vehicles, a new tanker aircraft, a new combat search and rescue helicopter, an upgrade of Department of Defense space systems, an operational focus on cyberwarfare capability and the beginning of nuclear systems modernization. On 11 July 2008, a formal retirement ceremony was held for Moseley; he officially retired from the Air Force on 11 August 2008 after 37+ years of uniformed service.

Background
Moseley was born in 1949 in Grand Prairie, Texas. He graduated from Texas A&M University in 1971 with a Bachelor of Arts degree in political science. He earned a Master of Arts degree from Texas A&M University in 1972, also in political science. He commanded the F-15 Division of the Air Force Fighter Weapons School at Nellis AFB, Nevada, the 33rd Operations Group at Eglin AFB, Florida, and the 57th Wing, the Air Force's largest, most diverse flying wing, also at Nellis. The general has served as the combat Director of Operations for Joint Task Force-Southwest Asia. General Moseley also commanded 9th Air Force and U.S. Central Command Air Forces while serving as Combined Forces Air Component Commander for Operations in Operation Southern Watch, Operation Enduring Freedom and Operation Iraqi Freedom. The general is a member of the Council on Foreign Relations. He has been awarded the Order of National Merit (Officer) and the Order of National Merit (Commander) by the president of the French Republic. The Order of National Merit is the second highest French military award. He has also been awarded the United Arab Emirates' Military Medal, 1st Class, by the president of the U.A.E.

Moseley's staff assignments have been a mix of operational, joint and personnel duties. These include serving in Washington, D.C., as Director for Legislative Liaison for the Secretary of the Air Force; Deputy Director for Politico-Military Affairs for Asia/Pacific and Middle East, the Joint Chiefs of Staff; Chief of the Air Force General Officer Matters Office; Chief of Staff of the Air Force Chair and Professor of Joint and Combined Warfare at the National War College; and Chief of the Tactical Fighter Branch, Tactical Forces Division, Directorate of Plans, Headquarters U.S. Air Force.

Moseley assumed the position of Chief of Staff of the Air Force during a ceremony at Andrews Air Force Base on September 2, 2005.

Moseley personally "adopted" the United States Air Force Academy Class of 2009 as his own, and has gone out of his way to address the future leaders of the U.S. Air Force.  On March 8, 2007, the Grand Prairie ISD school board unanimously voted to name an elementary school opening in the 2007–2008 school year Mike Moseley Elementary School in honor of his achievements and as a native of Grand Prairie.

As a result of a series of high-profile scandals and his resistance to the new drone programs, Moseley, along with the Secretary of the Air Force, was forced to resign. His resignation was on 5 June 2008, in the wake of a report that criticized the service's handling of nuclear-weapons security related to the 2007 United States Air Force nuclear weapons incident and a misshipment of nuclear missile components to Taiwan.  Following his resignation, Moseley continued to serve as Chief of Staff of the Air Force until his official retirement ceremony at Bolling AFB, Washington, D.C. on 11 July 2008. (See 2007 United States Air Force nuclear weapons incident)

On 11 July 2008,  Moseley had his formal retirement ceremony at Bolling Air Force Base in Washington, D.C. Former Secretary of the Air Force, the Honorable Michael Wynne presided over the ceremony. Moseley officially retired from the Air Force on August 1, 2008.

Education

 1971 Bachelor of Arts degree in political science, Texas A&M University, College Station, Texas
 1972 Master of Arts degree in political science, Texas A&M University, College Station, Texas
 1977 Squadron Officer School, Maxwell AFB, Alabama
 1981 Fighter Weapons Instructor Course, U.S. Air Force Fighter Weapons School, Nellis AFB, Nevada
 1984 Air Command and Staff College, Maxwell AFB, Alabama
 1988 U.S. Air Force Joint Senior Battle Commander's Course, Hurlburt Field, Florida
 1990 National War College, Fort Lesley J. McNair, Washington, D.C.
 2000 Combined Forces Air Component Commander Course, Maxwell AFB, Alabama, and Hurlburt Field, Florida

Assignments
 June 1972 – May 1973, student, Undergraduate Pilot Training, Webb AFB, Texas
 May 1973 – July 1977, T-37 instructor pilot and spin flight test pilot; flight check pilot, and standardization and evaluation flight examiner, 3389th Flying Training Squadron, 78th Flying Training Wing, Webb AFB, Texas
 July 1977 – September 1979, F-15 instructor pilot, flight lead and mission commander, 7th Tactical Fighter Squadron, Holloman AFB, New Mexico
 September 1979 – August 1983, F-15 weapons and tactics officer, instructor pilot, and flight lead and mission commander; standardization and evaluation/ flight examiner, 44th Tactical Fighter Squadron and 12th Tactical Fighter Squadron, Kadena Air Base, Japan
 August 1983 – June 1984, course officer, Air Command and Staff College, Maxwell AFB, Alabama
 June 1984 – June 1987, Chief, Tactical Fighter Branch, Tactical Forces Division, Directorate of Plans, Deputy Chief of Staff for Plans and Operations, Headquarters U.S. Air Force, Washington, D.C.
 June 1987 – June 1989, Commander, F-15 Division, and instructor pilot, Fighter Weapons Instructor Course, U.S. Air Force Fighter Weapons School, Nellis AFB, Nevada
 June 1989 – June 1990, course officer, National War College, Fort Lesley J. McNair, Washington, D.C.
 June 1990 – August 1992, Chief of Staff of the Air Force Chair and Professor of Joint and Combined Warfare, National War College, Fort Lesley J. McNair, Washington, D.C.
 August 1992 – January 1994, Commander, 33rd Operations Group, Eglin AFB, Florida
 January 1994 – May 1996, Chief, Air Force General Officer Matters Office, Headquarters U.S. Air Force, Washington, D.C.
 May 1996 – November 1997, Commander, 57th Wing, Nellis AFB, Nevada
 November 1997 – July 1999, Deputy Director for Politico-Military Affairs, Asia/Pacific and Middle East, Directorate for Strategic Plans and Policy, the Joint Chiefs of Staff, Washington, D.C.
 July 1999 – October 2001, Director, Legislative Liaison, Office of the Secretary of the Air Force, Headquarters U.S. Air Force, Washington, D.C.
 November 2001 – August 2003, Commander, 9th Air Force and U.S. Central Command Air Forces, Shaw AFB, South Carolina
 August 2003 – August 2005, Vice Chief of Staff, Headquarters U.S. Air Force, Washington, D.C.
 September 2005 – July 2008, Chief of Staff, Headquarters U.S. Air Force, Washington, D.C.

Flight information
Rating: Command pilot 
Flight hours: approximately 3,000 
Aircraft flown: T-37, T-38, AT-38 and F-15A/B/C/D

Honors
For his combat leadership of Operation Enduring Freedom, Operation Northern Watch, Operation Southern Watch, Operation Southern Focus, Operation Iraqi Freedom, General Moseley was awarded the General H.H. Arnold Award, the Air Force Association's highest tribute to leadership. Additionally, the Air Force Association has awarded him a "Life Time Achievement Award" for his efforts in support of the restoration of the Lafayette Escadrille Memorial in Paris, France. The Association has also named him a General Ira Eaker Fellow for "Principled Leadership" while serving as the 18thChief of Staff. Texas A&M University recognized his accomplishments and dedicated services with their Distinguished Alumnus Award, the highest honor bestowed upon a former student. Other leadership awards include: the Texas A&M University Corps of Cadets Hall of Honor, the South Carolina Chamber of Commerce Sergeant William Jasper Freedom Award, the General "Jimmy" Doolittle Award for leadership and dedication to American Air Power by the Massachusetts Institute of Technology and the General James Hartinger Award for achievements in advancing the military space mission. General Moseley was also the first inductee into the Frontier of Flight Hall of Fame in Dallas, Texas. General Moseley has also been singularly honored by the Mayor of Grand Prairie, Texas and by the Independent School District of Grand Prairie by having a public school named after him in his hometown – the Mike Moseley Elementary School.

General Moseley was knighted by Her Majesty the Queen of the United Kingdom as a Knight Commander of the Most Excellent Order of the British Empire (KBE). His Majesty, the King of Saudi Arabia, awarded him the King Abdulaziz Excellence Medal, the Kingdom's highest award. The President of the French Republic named him a Commander in the French National Order of Merit. That award is in addition to the President of the French Republic's previous naming him Officer of the French National Order of Merit. He has also been awarded the United Arab Emirates highest award and equally prestigious awards from the Minister of Defense from the Republic of Singapore and from Brazil.

General Moseley was personally awarded two Defense Distinguished Service Medals by the Secretary of Defense for his combat innovation and leadership in the Middle East as well as for his transformational vision for the American Military. Upon retirement, General Moseley was awarded a third United States Air Force Distinguished Service Medal for his combat and peacetime leadership and personal contributions to national security. Additionally, upon retirement, he was awarded Distinguished Service Medals from the Department of the Navy, the Department of the Army and from the Department of Homeland Security (United States Coast Guard). In September 2017, he was also awarded the Air Force's highest civilian award, the Distinguished Public Service Award for his post-retirement, continued contributions to national security by the Secretary and Chief of Staff of the United States Air Force. Moseley had an elementary school named in his honor in Moseley's home town of Grand Prairie, Texas in 2007.

Major awards and decorations

Effective dates of promotion

Activities since retirement 
Moseley has called for the retirement of the Fairchild Republic A-10 Thunderbolt II, comparing it to the North American P-51 Mustang which had been quickly retired after the Second World War and then even more quickly pressed back into active service at the start of the Korea War.

See also
 List of United States Air Force four-star generals

References
 
 Mike Moseley elementary website

Joint Chiefs of Staff
United States Air Force generals
Chiefs of Staff of the United States Air Force
Recipients of the Legion of Merit
Grand Prairie High School alumni
Texas A&M University alumni
Honorary Knights Commander of the Order of the British Empire
1949 births
Living people
Recipients of the Air Medal
Recipients of the Pingat Jasa Gemilang (Tentera)
Commanders of the Ordre national du Mérite
Recipients of the Defense Superior Service Medal
Vice Chiefs of Staff of the United States Air Force
Recipients of the Defense Distinguished Service Medal
Recipients of the Air Force Distinguished Service Medal